The Trinchera Celeste is an independent supporters group of O'Higgins, a football club in the Primera División de Chile. It's known as the barra brava of the club.

On February 9, 2013; the barra suffered a bus accident in Tomé. 16 people died, and 21 people got injured.

History

The barra was founded on July 28, 2002, after a match versus Deportes Antofagasta, match that finished 0:0. In the matches played in the Estadio El Teniente, the barra are located in the Angostura (North).

Tomé Tragedy

On February 9, 2013, after the match between the club and Huachipato, a group of fans traveled in a bus to Tomé, where in the Cuesta Caracol fell into a ravine, causing the death of 16 fans. The event marked the Chilean football, the city of Rancagua and Tomé, so that a date of mourning decreed in the different leagues of the ANFP, and a days in Rancagua and Tomé.

References

External links
  

O'Higgins F.C.
Rancagua
Chilean football supporters' associations
Ultras groups